Nociplastic pain or central sensitisation is a type of pain which is mechanically different from the normal nociceptive pain caused by inflammation and tissue damage or the neuropathic pain which results from nerve damage.  It may occur in combination with the other types of pain or in isolation.  Its location may be generalised or multifocal and it can be more intense than would be expected from any associated physical cause.

Its causes are not fully understood but it is thought to be a dysfunction of the central nervous system whose processing of pain signals may have become distorted or sensitised.

The concept and term was formally added to the taxonomy of the International Association for the Study of Pain following the recommendation of a task force in 2017.  The  root terms are Latin nocēre, meaning to hurt, and Greek πλαστός, meaning development or formation in a medical context.

This type of pain typically arises in some chronic pain conditions, with the archetypal condition being fibromyalgia. It may be a factor in long COVID. Exercise is commonly prescribed for such conditions. Nociplastic pain has also been hypothesized to play a role in the persistence of medically unexplained symptoms.

Definition
Nociplastic pain is a longterm complex pain, one of three mechanisms of pain, defined by the International Association for the Study of Pain as "pain that arises from altered nociception despite no clear evidence of actual or threatened tissue damage causing the activation of peripheral nociceptors or evidence for disease or lesion of the somatosensory system causing the pain". The other two mechanisms are nociceptive pain and neuropathic pain. Widespread pain and increased pain have been suggested as important clinical features.

Central sensitization is a broader term referring to a hyperexcitability of the nervous system, usually including hyperalgesia (increased sensitivity to pain), and allodynia (painful perception of non-painful stimuli).

An even broader term is that of central sensitivity syndromes, referring to syndromes characterized by the hyperexcitement of central neurons. These include fibromyalgia, irritable bowel syndrome, headaches, chronic fatigue syndrome and temporomandibular disorder.

Mechanism
Its causes are not fully understood but it is thought to be a dysfunction of the central nervous system whose processing of pain signals may have become distorted or sensitised. Specific central nervous system locations that have been suggested are nociceptive neurons, spinal and supraspinal structures, the dorsal horn and others.

Diagnosis
It is diagnosed by its clinical features and lack of response to regular painkillers. Pain is experienced in several body parts, and is often widespread and intense. There may be associated tiredness, and difficulties with memory, mood and sleep. It can occur on its own in conditions such as tension headache or fibromyalgia, or combined with other pain categories such as in chronic back pain.

Tools to measure central sensitization include sensory tests to painful stimuli, magnetic resonance imaging and measures of cytokines and neurotrophines in the blood and urine. Self-report questionnaires such as the Central Sensitization Inventory and the Sensory Hypersensitivity Scale are also used.

Treatment
Treatment generally requires both physical and psychological therapies, along with pain neuroscience education.

References 

Pain